An election for 16 Scottish representative peers took place on 6 October 1959 at the Palace of Holyroodhouse in Edinburgh. It turned out to be the last election for representative peers as in 1963 all holders of titles in the Peerage of Scotland were made eligible to sit in the House of Lords.

Procedure
The date, time and place of the meeting was set in a Royal Proclamation of 18 September 1959, issued on the day that the previous Parliament was dissolved. The Duke of Buccleuch and Queensberry, who held the role of Lord Clerk Register, presided. When the Principal Clerk of Session George Macdonald read the roll of Peers of Scotland, 115 names were read, and 25 answered that they were present. None of the Peers produced any proxies for those who were absent, but 28 Peers had submitted "Signed Lists" as a form of absent voting. The Duke of Buccleuch himself chose not to vote; this was the "customary but not compulsory practice" of the Lord Clerk Register.

Result

Four new representative peers were elected who had not sat in the previous Parliament - the Earls of Mar and Kellie, Northesk, and Dundonald, and Lord Sinclair.

Votes cast

See also
 List of Scottish representative peers

References

 "MINUTES OF MEETING held on the 6th October, 1959, of PEERS OF SCOTLAND for the ELECTION OF THEIR REPRESENTATIVES to sit and vote in the ensuing Parliament of Great Britain and Northern Ireland." House of Lords paper 14 of Session 1959–60, HMSO.

Peerage of Scotland
Scottish representative peers election
Scottish representative peers election
Scottish representative peers election
Scottish representative peers